Mycobacterium mageritense
Etymology: Magerit, is Arabic for Madrid, where it was first isolated from human sputum.

Description
Gram-positive, nonmotile and strongly acid-fast rods.

Colony characteristics
Smooth, mucoid and nonphotochromogenic colonies.

Physiology
Rapid growth on Löwenstein-Jensen medium at 22 °C, 30 °C, 37 °C and 45 °C within 2–4 days.
Optimum growth at 30 °C and 37 °C.
Resistant to isoniazid, cycloserine, capreomycin, pyrazinamide, and thiosemicarbazone
Most strains are also resistant to ethambutol.

Differential characteristics
Characterised by unique hsp65 gene, 16S rDNA and sodA sequences. *Closely related to M. fortuitum and M. peregrinum at the DNA homology level.
Differentiation from M. fortuitum by its growth at 45 °C and by its use of mannitol as a sole carbon source.

Pathogenesis
Biosafety level 1

Type strain
First isolated from human sputum in Madrid
Strain 938 = ATCC 700351 = CCUG 37984 = CIP 104973 = DSM 44476 = JCM 12375.

References

Domenech et al. 1997.  Mycobacterium mageritense sp. nov. Int. J. Syst. Bacteriol., 47, 535–540.

External links
Type strain of Mycobacterium mageritense at BacDive -  the Bacterial Diversity Metadatabase

Acid-fast bacilli
mageritense
Bacteria described in 1997